Parisolabis is a genus of earwigs in the subfamily Parisolabiinae. It was cited by Srivastava in Part 2 of Fauna of India. It was also cited at an earlier date by Steinmann in his publication, The Animal Kingdom in 1986, 1989, 1990, and 1993.

References

External links 
 The Earwig Research Centre's Parisolabis database Source for references: type Parisolabis in the "genus" field and click "search".

Anisolabididae
Dermaptera genera